A Short History of the Confederate States of America is a memoir written by Jefferson Davis, completed shortly before his death in 1889.  Davis wrote most of this book while staying at Beauvoir along the Mississippi Gulf Coast near Biloxi, Mississippi.

The book is much less a Davis memoir than an articulation of the secession argument.  In Davis' earlier work, The Rise and Fall of the Confederate Government, he had written what is probably the most thorough exegesis of the compact theory of the United States Constitution in existence, devoting the first fifteen chapters of the book to that topic.  Fearful that his readers might not understand, or might forget, he repeated the explanation every second or third chapter after that.  Still concerned that people might not understand the compact theory of the Constitution, he wrote A Short History of the Confederate States of America shortly before his death.

The book was first published in 1890 by Belford Co. in New York.

See also
Confederate States of America
The Rise and Fall of the Confederate Government by Jefferson Davis

References

External links
 A Short History of the Confederate States of America at the Internet Archive
 Jefferson Davis Bibliography. Retrieved 2005-03-02.
 Publishing Houses at Major American Publishers (Information compiled by The Hyde Park Book Store). Retrieved 2005-03-02.

1890 non-fiction books
American Civil War memoirs
History of the Confederate States of America
Jefferson Davis